Richard Murray Simpson (August 30, 1900 – January 7, 1960) was a Republican member of the U.S. House of Representatives from Pennsylvania.

Richard Simpson was born in Huntingdon, Pennsylvania, the son of Warren Brown and Sue Simpson. His father and uncle constructed Raystown Lake, the largest lake entirely within Pennsylvania. He married Grace Metz in 1928, and they had two daughters, Susan and Barbara. She died in 1945, and he married Mae Cox in 1948; they had one daughter, Kay. He graduated from the University of Pittsburgh, in 1923 and from Georgetown Law School in Washington, D.C., in 1942. During the First World War, Simpson served as a private in the Three Hundred and First Company, Tank Corps. He was engaged in the insurance business from 1923 to 1937. He served in the Pennsylvania State House of Representatives from 1935 to 1937.

Simpson was elected as a Republican to the 75th United States Congress to fill the vacancy caused by the death of Benjamin K. Focht. He was re-elected to the Seventy-sixth and to the ten succeeding Congresses and served until his death in 1960. Simpson voted in favor of the Civil Rights Act of 1957.

In 1953, he became chair of the National Republican Congressional Committee. He had previously served as vice chairman of the House Republican Conference and secretary of the House Republican Policy Committee. At the time of his death, he was the ranking member of the powerful Ways and Means Committee.

He died on January 7, 1960, at Bethesda Naval Medical Center, several weeks after undergoing brain surgery.

See also
 List of United States Congress members who died in office (1950–99)

References

 Retrieved on 2008-01-26

1900 births
1960 deaths
Republican Party members of the Pennsylvania House of Representatives
University of Pittsburgh alumni
United States Army personnel of World War I
Military personnel from Pennsylvania
People from Huntingdon, Pennsylvania
Georgetown University Law Center alumni
Republican Party members of the United States House of Representatives from Pennsylvania
20th-century American politicians